Below is the all-time medal table for Summer Asian Para Games from 2010 to 2018. This does not include the medals won at the  other events hosted by the Asian Paralympic Committee.

Games

Medals

NPCs with medals

NPCs without medals

Ranked medal table

See also 
 All-time Asian Games medal table
 All-time Asian Winter Games medal table

References

External links 
 Asian Paralympic Committee
 Asian Para Games

Asian Para Games
Asian Games medal tables